Angelo Peter Simon (born 6 December 1974) is a Tanzanian long-distance runner. He competed in the men's marathon at the 2000 Summer Olympics.

References

External links
 

1974 births
Living people
Athletes (track and field) at the 2000 Summer Olympics
Tanzanian male long-distance runners
Tanzanian male marathon runners
Olympic athletes of Tanzania
Place of birth missing (living people)